Fathul Bari Mat Jahya is a Muslim lecturer and politician from Malaysia.

Statements in the mainstream media
Bari criticized Penang's then Chief Minister Lim Guan Eng for inciting that the word 'Allah' can be used by non-Muslims. He also stated that Lim Guan Eng Should not take the issue as a political weapon as it will disrupt the whole majority Muslim in this country.

Bari criticized former law minister Zaid Ibrahim - who stated that the lack of religious discourse by the religious leaders that does not allow for different interpretations of Islam promotes extremism and makes Malaysia similar to the Islamic State of Iraq and Syria - stating that liberals such as Ibrahim seem to only want to follow civil laws but not those created by Allah and that it is the responsibility of the Ulema to specifically identify what is wajib (obligatory), halal (allowed), and haram (prohibited).

Controversies
Bari was accused of being a Wahhabi and deviates from Islamic teaching by PAS leaders. However, the statements made by these leaders are considered by some as political attacks.

Election results

Honours
  :
  Knight Companion of the Order of the Crown of Pahang (DIMP) - Dato' (2015)

References 

1980 births
Malaysian people of Malay descent
Living people
Malaysian Muslims
People from Kedah
United Malays National Organisation politicians